The Richmond German Christmas Dance is an annual ball held during the Christmas season at The Commonwealth Club in Richmond, Virginia. Founded in 1866, shortly after the end of the American Civil War, it is the oldest debutante ball in Virginia.

About 
The Richmond German Christmas Dance was founded in 1866, shortly after the end of the American Civil War by the city's civil leaders. It was named after a popular Prussian dance. The ball served as a way for prominent families of the Antebellum period to maintain their status in the new era.

The dance is one of two premier debutante balls in Richmond, the other being the Bal du Bois. The dance is held annually at The Commonwealth Club, a private gentlemen's club. It is hosted by the Richmond German, a gentlemen's secret dance society. Debutantes are typically relatives of members of the society.

References 

1866 establishments in Virginia
Annual events in Virginia
Balls in the United States
Christmas in the United States
Culture of Richmond, Virginia
Dance in Virginia
Debutante balls
German-American culture in Virginia
History of Richmond, Virginia
Winter events in the United States
History of women in Virginia